Zurab Popkhadze (2 June 197215 January 2013) was a Georgian professional footballer. He made his professional debut in the Meore Liga in 1990 for FC Hereti Lagodekhi. He also won four caps for the Georgia national football team.

Popkhadze died on 15 January 2013, committing suicide by hanging.

References

1972 births
2013 deaths
Suicides by hanging in Georgia (country)
Footballers from Georgia (country)
Expatriate footballers from Georgia (country)
PFC Krylia Sovetov Samara players
FC Lokomotiv Nizhny Novgorod players
FC Spartak Vladikavkaz players
FC Kryvbas Kryvyi Rih players
FC Alazani Gurjaani players
Georgia (country) international footballers
Expatriate footballers in Ukraine
Expatriate sportspeople from Georgia (country) in Ukraine
Expatriate footballers in Russia
Russian Premier League players
Ukrainian Premier League players
Association football defenders
FC Novokuznetsk players
2013 suicides